Le choc is a 1982 French crime thriller film directed by Robin Davis and starring Alain Delon, Catherine Deneuve, and Philippe Léotard. Based on the novel The Prone Gunman (La position du tireur couché)  by Jean-Patrick Manchette, the film is about a hitman who wants to retire from his life in organized crime and flees to the country where he meets and falls in love with a beautiful woman.

Plot
Martin Terrier (Alain Delon) wants to quit his job as a hired hitman, but his organized crime employers are unwilling to see him turned out to pasture, Terrier knows too much, and he is still useful to the organization. He escapes to the countryside where he meets Claire (Catherine Deneuve), and the two soon fall in love. Back in Paris to confront his employers, Terrier learns that they've stolen all his money from the bank. They give him an ultimatum—do one last job for them and he gets his money and his freedom.

Reviews
The film was reviewed in Variety and Los Angeles Times.

Cast
 Alain Delon as Martin Terrier / Christian
 Catherine Deneuve as Claire
 Philippe Léotard as Félix
 Étienne Chicot as Michel
 François Perrot as Cox
 Stéphane Audran as Jeanne Faulques 
 Féodor Atkine as Borévitch, aka "Boro"
 Catherine Leprince as Mathilde
 Jean-Louis Richard as Maubert
 Franck-Olivier Bonnet as Silvio
 Dany Kogan as Rosana
 Myriam Pisacane as The Blue Angel
 Isabelle Mergault as The bank employee

References

External links
 
 

1982 films
1980s crime thriller films
Films about contract killing
Films based on French novels
French crime thriller films
French neo-noir films
Films directed by Robin Davis
Films scored by Philippe Sarde
1980s French films